Columbus Discovers Kraehwinkel is a 1954 West German comedy film directed by Ulrich Erfurth and Alexander Paal and starring Eva Kerbler,  Rudolf Platte and two sons of Charlie Chaplin, Charles Chaplin Jr. and Sydney Chaplin .

The film's sets were designed by the art director Albrecht Becker and Herbert Kirchhoff. It was shot at the Wandsbek Studios in Hamburg and on location around Michelstadt.

Partial cast
 Charles Chaplin Jr. as Jimmy Hunter
 Sydney Chaplin as Clark Hunter
 Eva Kerbler as Eva Wagner
 Paola Loew as Suzi Merzheim
 Rudolf Platte as Lüttgen
 Paul Henckels as Wagner
 Ursula Herking as Mrs. Wagner
 Carl Wery as Merzheim
 Paul Westermeier as Maier
 Hubert von Meyerinck as Regwitz
 Joseph Egger as Wiebel

References

External links
 

1954 films
West German films
1954 comedy films
German comedy films
1950s German-language films
Films directed by Ulrich Erfurth
Real Film films
Films shot at Wandsbek Studios
German black-and-white films
1950s German films